Roman Sidorowicz (born 8 August 1991) is a Swiss handball player for Pfadi Winterthur and the Swiss national team.

He represented Switzerland at the 2020 European Men's Handball Championship.

His father is Polish, his mother Dutch.

References

External links

1991 births
Living people
Swiss male handball players
People from Horgen
Expatriate handball players
Swiss expatriate sportspeople in Germany
Handball-Bundesliga players
MT Melsungen players
Swiss people of Polish descent
Swiss people of Dutch descent
Sportspeople from the canton of Zürich